Daniel McKenzie (born 24 October 1988 in Reading, Berkshire) is a British professional racing driver from England.

Career

Early career
Like most young drivers, McKenzie began his career in karting, racing in the Junior Rotax class before making his car racing debut in the Radical SR4 Biduro Championship in 2005, where he finished in fourth place.

Formula BMW
In 2006, McKenzie made his debut in single–seaters, taking part in the Formula BMW UK series with the Promatecme – RPM team. In his maiden season he scored three points to finish in 19th place. At the end of the year, he changed to the Fortec Motorsport team to contest the Formula BMW World Final in Valencia, where he finished 20th.

McKenzie continued with Fortec in Formula BMW UK for 2007, ending the season in eleventh position, with teammate Marcus Ericsson taking the title. He once again entered the Formula BMW World Final in Valencia at the end of the season, but retired from the race. He also competed in two races of the Formula BMW ADAC championship in Germany.

Formula Renault 2.0
The following year, McKenzie graduated to Formula Renault, racing in both the Eurocup Formula Renault 2.0 and Formula Renault 2.0 West European Cup with Fortec Motorsport. In the Eurocup he failed to score a point, taking a best race result of 14th in his home round at Silverstone, whilst in the West European Cup he took one points finish at Estoril to be classified 23rd in the final standings.

Formula Three
In 2009, McKenzie made the step up to the British Formula 3 Championship with Fortec, racing in the National Class for older Dallara F307 chassis. He secured the title at the penultimate round of the season in Portimão, on the same weekend when Daniel Ricciardo won the International Class title. During the season, he took nineteen podium places out of a possible twenty races, including eleven class wins, with his only race retirement coming in the first race at Hockenheim, where he collided with National Class rival Gabriel Dias.

At the end of the season, McKenzie made his first appearance in the famous Macau Grand Prix event. After finishing 25th in the qualification race, he was forced to retire from the main event following a multi–car accident on the opening lap.

McKenzie moved into the International Class for the 2010 season, staying with Fortec where he was joined by Oliver Webb and Max Snegirev. He finished the season in ninth place overall, taking two reverse–grid victories at Rockingham Motor Speedway and Brands Hatch along with two other podium places. He was also the only driver in the International Class to finish all 30 races during the season.

Formula Renault 3.5 Series

After taking part in Formula Renault 3.5 Series testing with Fortec in October 2010, McKenzie stepped up to the series for the 2011 season, joining former champions Comtec Racing where he partnered Formula Renault 2.0 graduate Daniël de Jong.

Formula Two
In March 2012, it was announced McKenzie would make the switch to the FIA Formula Two Championship for 2012.

Racing record

Career summary

Complete Formula Renault 3.5 Series results
(key) (Races in bold indicate pole position) (Races in italics indicate fastest lap)

Complete FIA Formula Two Championship results
(key) (Races in bold indicate pole position) (Races in italics indicate fastest lap)

References

External links
 Official website
 Career details from Driver Database
 

1988 births
Living people
Sportspeople from Reading, Berkshire
English racing drivers
British Formula Three Championship drivers
Formula Renault Eurocup drivers
Formula Renault 2.0 WEC drivers
Formula BMW UK drivers
Formula BMW ADAC drivers
World Series Formula V8 3.5 drivers
FIA Formula Two Championship drivers
Blancpain Endurance Series drivers
European Le Mans Series drivers
Comtec Racing drivers
Fortec Motorsport drivers
OAK Racing drivers